Prem Kumar Reang (Born May 10, 1974) is a politician from Tripura. He is currently associated with Indigenous People's Front of Tripura. He participated in election from Kanchanpur in 2018 and he won. He is currently Member of the Legislative Assembly (India) of Kanchanpur

In 2022, he became Minister of Fisheries and Co-Operation and Tribal Welfare (TRP & PTG) in Manik Saha ministry.
He is currently minister of three ministry in Tripura.
He was one of the active voice for Bru Issue

References

1974 births
Living people
Indian politicians

See Also

 Tripuri people
 Indigenous Peoples Front of Tripura
  Tripura